Gregory Earl Stemrick (October 25, 1951 – August 2, 2016) was an American football defensive back in the NFL for the Houston Oilers and New Orleans Saints. Before his professional career, Stemrick played for Colorado State. He then played for the Chicago Fire of the WFL. He died of a heart attack in 2016.

References

1951 births
2016 deaths
Players of American football from Cincinnati
American football cornerbacks
Houston Oilers players
New Orleans Saints players
American Conference Pro Bowl players
Colorado State Rams football players
Chicago Fire (WFL) players

Greg Sr. Had one son, Greg Jr (Pamela - mother), 3 granddaughters Jala, Khayriyah and Amani Stemrick and 1 great granddaughter Journi.